NCF may refer to:

 Cyanogen fluoride, a toxic, explosive inorganic linear compound
 National Capital FreeNet, an ISP in Ottawa, Canada
 National Championship Foundation, an organization that retroactively selected NCAA college football national champions from 1869-1870 and 1872-2000
 National Christian Foundation, a US Evangelical Christian donations organization
 National Civic Federation, 1900–1920s US labor organization
 National Commerce Financial Corporation, Tennessee, NYSE symbol, 2001–2005
 National Cultural Foundation of Barbados
 National Cybersecurity FFRDC, a US-funded research and development center operated by MITRE Corporation in support of NIST
 New Century Foundation, a US white supremacist organization founded in 1994
 Next Century Foundation, a London-based think tank on Middle Eastern conflicts
 Nicaraguan Cycling Federation, the national governing body of cycle racing in Nicaragua
 Nigeria Cricket Federation, the national governing body of cricket in Nigeria
 No-Conscription Fellowship, a British pacifist organization
 Nomenclature Committee for Fungi, a committee of the International Botanical Congress